Otluca is a village in the Şavşat District, Artvin Province, Turkey. Its population is 82 (2021).

References

Villages in Şavşat District